Sidney David Drell (September 13, 1926 – December 21, 2016) was an American theoretical physicist and arms control expert.

At the time of his death, he was professor emeritus at the Stanford Linear Accelerator Center (SLAC) and senior fellow at Stanford University's Hoover Institution.  Drell was a noted contributor in the fields of quantum electrodynamics and high-energy particle physics. The Drell–Yan process is partially named for him.

Biography
Born in Atlantic City, New Jersey, Drell graduated from Atlantic City High School.

He earned his undergraduate degree in physics from Princeton University in 1946, having been admitted at the age of 16. He was awarded a masters in physics in 1947 and received his PhD from the University of Illinois in 1949. He co-authored the textbooks Relativistic Quantum Mechanics and Relativistic Quantum Fields with James Bjorken. Drell was active as a scientific advisor to the U.S. government, and was a founding member of the JASON Defense Advisory Group. He was also on the board of directors of Los Alamos National Security, the company that operates the Los Alamos National Laboratory. He was an expert in the field of nuclear arms control and cofounder of the Center for International Security and Arms Control, now the Center for International Security and Cooperation. He was a Senior Fellow at Stanford's Hoover Institution and an accomplished violinist. He was a trustee Emeritus at the Institute for Advanced Study in Princeton, New Jersey.

He was the father of Persis Drell, former head of SLAC national accelerator lab, former dean of the Stanford University School of Engineering, and now current provost of Stanford University; Joanna Drell, Professor of History and chair of the Department of History at the University of Richmond; and Daniel Drell, a program officer at the U.S. Department of Energy. Sidney Drell died in December 2016 at his home in Palo Alto, California at the age of 90.

Awards and honors
 Member of the National Academy of Sciences (1969)
 Fellow of the American Academy of Arts and Sciences (1971)
 Member of the American Philosophical Society (1987)
 The 11th Annual Heinz Award in Public Policy
 Enrico Fermi Award, 2000
 National Intelligence Distinguished Service Medal, 2001
 National Medal of Science, 2011 (presented by President Barack Obama on February 1, 2013)

References

External links

 Oral history interview transcript with Sidney Drell on 1 July 1986, American Institute of Physics, Niels Bohr Library & Archives
 SLAC: Sidney Drell
 Hoover Institution: Sidney Drell
Sidney D. Drell papers at the Hoover Institution Archives
The Academic Tree

1926 births
2016 deaths
Atlantic City High School alumni
Members of the United States National Academy of Sciences
Fellows of the American Academy of Arts and Sciences
Trustees of the Institute for Advanced Study
American physicists
Enrico Fermi Award recipients
MacArthur Fellows
People from Atlantic City, New Jersey
Princeton University alumni
Stanford University Department of Physics faculty
Particle physicists
Los Alamos National Laboratory personnel
Members of JASON (advisory group)
Recipients of the National Intelligence Distinguished Service Medal
Members of the American Philosophical Society
Presidents of the American Physical Society